DVFS may refer to:

 Delaware Valley Friends School, Pennsylvania, US
 Dynamic voltage and frequency scaling, a power management technique in computer architecture